Cymbachus elegans is a species of handsome fungus beetles in the genus Cymbachus.

It is found in Laos, Southeast Asia.

External links 

 Cymbachus elegans at biolib.cz

Endomychidae
Beetles of Asia
Insects of Laos
Beetles described in 1920